The Universidade Colinas de Boé  (UCB) is a private institution of higher education in Guinea-Bissau. It was founded in September 2003, just before the creation of the Universidade Amílcar Cabral, the only public university in the country. In 2007, it established a cooperation agreement with the Polytechnic Institute of Leiria (IPL).

References

Universities in Guinea-Bissau
Educational institutions established in 2003
2003 establishments in Guinea-Bissau
Buildings and structures in Bissau